Vukašin Tomić (Serbian Cyrillic: Bукaшин Томић; born 8 April 1987 in Kruševac) is a Serbian footballer who plays for Víkingur Gøta in the Faroe Islands Premier League.

Career

Flamurtari
In January 2015 Tomić signed an 18-month contract with Albanian Superliga side Flamurtari Vlorë, becoming the first Serbian player to play for the club.

Following a run of poor performances, Tomić was released by the club alongside Baćo Nikolić and Yani Urdinov on 16 April 2015.

References

External links
 Profile at Srbijafudbal 
 
 Vukašin Tomić at Utakmica.rs 
 Vukašin Tomić at Footballdatabase
 

1987 births
Living people
Serbian footballers
Association football defenders
FK Napredak Kruševac players
FK Jagodina players
FK Mladost Lučani players
FC Taraz players
FC U Craiova 1948 players
Flamurtari Vlorë players
FK Radnik Surdulica players
FK Spartak Subotica players
FC Gandzasar Kapan players
Víkingur Gøta players
Serbian SuperLiga players
Kategoria Superiore players
Kazakhstan Premier League players
Faroe Islands Premier League players
Serbian expatriate footballers
Expatriate footballers in Kazakhstan
Expatriate footballers in Romania
Expatriate footballers in Albania
Serbian expatriate sportspeople in Kazakhstan
Serbian expatriate sportspeople in Albania